The following is a list of language families. It also includes language isolates, unclassified languages and other types.

Major language families

By number of languages
Ethnologue 24 (2021) lists the following families that contain at least 1% of the 7,139 known languages in the world:

Niger–Congo (1,542 languages) (21.7%)
Austronesian (1,257 languages) (17.7%)
Trans–New Guinea (482 languages) (6.8%)
Sino-Tibetan (455 languages) (6.4%)
Indo-European (448 languages) (6.3%)
Australian [dubious] (381 languages) (5.4%)
Afro-Asiatic (377 languages) (5.3%)
Nilo-Saharan [dubious] (206 languages) (2.9%)
Oto-Manguean (178 languages) (2.5%)
Austroasiatic (167 languages) (2.3%)
Tai–Kadai (91 languages) (1.3%)
Dravidian (86 languages) (1.2%)
Tupian (76 languages) (1.1%)

Glottolog 4.6 (2022) lists the following as the largest families, of 8,565 languages:

 Atlantic–Congo (1,406 languages) 
 Austronesian (1,271 languages) 
 Indo-European (583 languages) 
 Sino-Tibetan (501 languages)
 Afro-Asiatic (379 languages)
 Nuclear Trans–New Guinea (317 languages) 
 Pama–Nyungan (250 languages)
 Oto-Manguean (181 languages)
 Austroasiatic (158 languages)
 Tai–Kadai (95 languages)
 Dravidian (82 languages)
 Arawakan (77 languages)
 Mande (75 languages)
 Tupian (71 languages)

Language counts can vary significantly depending on what is considered a dialect; for example Lyle Campbell counts only 27 Otomanguean languages, although he, Ethnologue and Glottolog also disagree as to which languages belong in the family.

Language families by region
Campbell identifies a total of 406 independent language families, including language isolates. Extinct languages are marked by daggers (†).

Africa

Africa (42)

Afro-Asiatic
Bangi Me (isolate)
Berta
Central Sudanic
Daju
Dizoid
Dogon
Eastern Jebel
Furan
Gimojan (Gonga–Gimojan)
Hadza (isolate)
Heiban
Ijoid
Jalaa† (isolate)
Kadu (Kadugli–Krongo)
Khoe
Kresh–Aja
Kxʼa (Ju–ǂHoan)
Koman
Kuliak
Kunama
Laal (isolate)
Maban
Mande
Mao
Nara (isolate?)
Narrow Talodi
Niger–Congo
Nilotic
Nubian (+ Meroitic)
Nyimang
Rashad
Saharan
Sandawe (isolate?)
Songhay
South Omotic (Aroid?)
Surmic
Ta-Ne-Omotic
Tama (Taman)
Tegem (Lafofa) (isolate?, unclassified?, family?, Niger–Congo?)
Temein
Tuu

Americas

The Americas have a total of 175 language families, including language isolates, according to Campbell (2019).

North America (54)

Adai† (isolate [unclassified?])
Algic
Alsea† (isolate)
Atakapa† (isolate, small family?)
Beothuk† (isolate)
Caddoan
Cayuse† (isolate)
Chimakuan†
Chimariko† (isolate)
Chinookan†
Chitimacha† (isolate)
Chumashan†
Coahuilteco† (isolate)
Cochimí–Yuman
Comecrudan†
Coosan†
Cotoname† (isolate)
Eskimo–Aleut
Esselen† (isolate)
Haida (isolate, small family?)
Iroquoian
Kalapuyan†
Karankawa† (isolate)
Karuk (Karok) (isolate)
Keresan
Kiowa–Tanoan
Kootenai (Kutenai) (isolate)
Maiduan
Muskogean
Na–Dene (strict sense, Athapaskan–Eyak—Tlingit)
Natchez† (isolate)
Palaihnihan
Plateau (Plateau Penutian)
Pomoan
Salinan†
Salishan
Shastan†
Siouan–Catawban
Siuslaw† (isolate)
Takelma† (isolate)
Timucuan†
Tonkawa† (isolate)
Tsimshianic
Tunica† (isolate)
Utian (Miwok–Costanoan)
Uto–Aztecan
Wakashan
Washo (isolate)
Wintuan
Yana† (isolate)
Yokutsan
Yuchi (isolate)
Yukian†
Zuni (isolate)

Mexico and Mesoamerica (14)

Cuitlatec† (isolate)
Guaicurian†
Huave (isolate)
Jicaquean (Tol)
Lencan†
Mayan
Misumalpan
Mixe–Zoquean
Otomanguean
Seri (isolate)
Tarascan (Purépecha) (isolate)
Tequistlatecan
Totonacan
Xinkan†

South America (107)

Aikanã (isolate)
Andaquí† (isolate)
Andoque (isolate)
Arara do Rio Branco† (Arara do Beiradão, Mato Grosso Arara) (isolate)
Arawakan
Arawan
Atacameño (Cunza, Kunza)† (isolate)
Awaké (Arutani)† (isolate)
Aymaran
Barbacoan
Betoi–Jirara† (isolate)
Boran
Bororoan
Cahuapanan
Camsá (isolate)
Cañar–Puruhá (Ecuador) (uncertain family of 2 languages)
Candoshi (Canndoshi–Sharpa) (isolate)
Canichana† (isolate)
Cariban
Cayuvava† (Cayubaba) (isolate)
Chapacuran
Charruan†
Chibchan
Chipaya–Uru
Chiquitano (isolate)
Chocoan
Cholonan†
Chonan
Chono† (isolate)
Cofán (A'ingaé) (isolate)
Culli (Culle)† (isolate)
Esmeralda (Atacame)† (isolate)
Fulnio (Yaté) (isolate)
Guachí† (isolate)
Guaicuruan
Guajiboan
Guamo† (isolate)
Guató† (isolate)
Harákmbut–Katukinan
Huarpean†
Irantxe (Münkü) (isolate)
Itonama (isolate)
Jabutían
Jêan (Jê family)
Jeikó† (isolate) [Macro–Jêan?]
Jirajaran†
Jivaroan
Jotí (Yuwana) (isolate)
Kakua–Nukak
Kamakanan†
Kapixaná (Kanoé) (isolate)
Karajá
Karirían†
Kaweskaran
Krenákan (Botocudan)
Kwaza (Koayá) (isolate)
Leco† (isolate)
Lule–Vilelan†
Máko† (Maku) (isolate)
Mapudungun
Mascoyan (Enlhet–Enenlhet)
Matacoan
Matanawí† (isolate)
Maxakalían
Mochica (Yunga)† (isolate)
Mosetén–Chimané (isolate)
Movima (isolate)
Munichi† (isolate)
Muran (Pirahã) (isolate, small family?)
Nadehup ("Makúan")
Nambiquaran
Ofayé (Opayé) (isolate)
Omurano† (isolate)
Otomacoan†
Paez (isolate?)
Pano–Takanan
Payaguá† (isolate)
Puinave (isolate)
Puquina† (isolate)
Purí–Coroado† (isolate)
Quechuan
Rikbaktsá (Canoeiro) (isolate)
Sáliban
Sapé (Kaliana)† (isolate)
Sechura–Catacaoan†
Taruma† (Ta ruamá) (isolate)
Taushiro (isolate)
Tequiraca† (isolate)
Tikuna–Yurí
Timotean†
Tiniguan†
Trumai (isolate)
Tukanoan
Tupían
Urarina (isolate)
Waorani (isolate)
Warao (isolate)
Witotoan
Xukurúan†
Yagan (Yámana)† (isolate)
Yaguan
Yanomaman
Yaruro (Pumé) (isolate)
Yuracaré (isolate)
Yurumangui† (isolate)
Zamucoan
Zaparoan

Nikulin (2020) considers the Macro-Jê family to consist of Bororoan, Chiquitano, Jabutían, Jêan, Jeikó, Kamakanan, Karajá, Krenákan, Maxakalían, Ofayé, Purí–Coroado, and Rikbaktsá. If Nikulin's Macro-Jê is accepted as valid, this would bring the total number of independent language families and isolates in South America down to 96.

Eurasia

Eurasia (34)

Ainu (isolate)
Austroasiatic
Austronesian
Basque (isolate)
Burushaski (isolate)
Chukotko-Kamchatkan
Dravidian
Elamite† (isolate)
Great Andamanese
Hattic† (isolate)
Hruso (Hruso–Aka)
Hurrian–(Hurro-Urartian)†
Indo-European
Japonic
Kartvelian
Kassite† (isolate)
Koreanic
Kusunda (isolate)
Miao–Yao (Hmong–Mien)
Mongolian
Nakh–Dagestanian (Northeast Caucasian)
Nihali (isolate)
Nivkh (isolate, possibly a small family)
Northwest Caucasian
Onge–Jarawa
Sino–Tibetan
Sumerian† (isolate)
Tai–Kadai
Tungusic
Turkic
Tyrsenian (Etruscan–Lemnian)†
Uralic
Yeniseian
Yukaghir

Papuan

All of the following language families and isolates are frequently geographically classified as Papuan languages. This brings the total number of Papuan families and isolates to 125 according to Campbell (2019). Palmer et al. (2018), however, recognizes 80 Papuan language families and isolates.

Papuan (125)

Abinomn (isolate)
Abun (isolate)
Afra (Usku) (isolate)
Amto–Musan
Anêm (isolate)
Angan
Anim
Ap Ma (Botin, Kambot, Kambrambo) (isolate)
Arafundi
Asaba (isolate)
Awin–Pa
Baibai–Fas
Baining
Baiyamo (isolate)
Banaro (isolate)
Bayono–Awbono
Bilua (isolate)
Bogaya (isolate)
Border
Bosavi
Bulaka River
Burmeso (isolate)
Busa (Odiai) (isolate)
Dagan
Damal (Uhunduni, Amung) (isolate)
Dem (isolate)
Dibiyaso (isolate)
Doso–Turumsa
Duna (isolate)
East Bird's Head
East Kutubu
East Strickland
Eastern Trans-Fly
Eleman
Elseng (Morwap) (isolate)
Fasu (isolate)
Geelvink Bay
Goilalan
Guriaso (isolate)
Hatam–Mansim
Inanwatan
Kaki Ae (isolate)
Kamula (isolate)
Kapauri (isolate) (Kapori)
Karami
Kaure–Narau (possibly an isolate)
Kayagar
Kehu (isolate)
Kibiri-Porome (isolate)
Kimki (isolate)
Kiwaian
Koiarian
Kol (isolate)
Kolopom
Konda–Yahadian
Kosare (isolate)
Kuot (isolate)
Kwalean
Kwerbic
Kwomtari
Lakes Plain
Lavukaleve (isolate)
Left May (Arai)
Lepki–Murkim
Lower Sepik–Ramu
Mailuan
Mairasi
Manubaran
Marori (Moraori)
Masep (isolate)
Mawes (isolate)
Maybrat (isolate)
Mombum (family, 2 languages)
Monumbo (family, 2 languages)
Mor (isolate)
Morehead–Wasur
Mpur (isolate)
Namla–Tofanma
Nimboran
North Bougainville
North Halmahera
Ndu
Pahoturi
Pauwasi
Pawaia
Pele-Ata
Piawi
Powle-Ma ("Molof") (isolate)
Purari ("Namau") (isolate)
Pyu (isolate)
Sause (isolate)
Savosavo (isolate)
Senagi
Sentani
Sepik
Sko (Skou)
Somahai
South Bird's Head
South Bougainville
Suki–Gogodala
Sulka (isolate)
Tabo (Waia) (isolate)
Taiap (isolate)
Tambora† (isolate)
Tanahmerah (isolate)
Taulil–Butam
Teberan
Timor–Alor–Pantar
Tor–Orya
Torricelli
Touo (isolate)
Trans New Guinea
Turama–Kikori
Ulmapo ("Mongol–Langam")
Walio
West Bird's Head
West Bomberai
Wiru (isolate)
Yale (Yalë, Nagatman) (isolate)
Yareban
Yawa
Yele (Yélî Dnye) (isolate)
Yerakai (isolate)
Yetfa-Biksi (isolate)
Yuat

Australia

Campbell (2019) recognizes 30 independent Australian language families and isolates.

Australia (30)

Bachamal† (isolate, possibly Northern Daly family)
Bunaban
Eastern Daly†
Gaagudju† (isolate)
Garrwan
Giimbiyu†
Gunwinyguan
Iwaidjan
Jarrakan
Kungarakany† (isolate)
Limilngan†
Mangarrayi† (isolate)
Maningrida
Maran
Marrku–Wurrugu
Mirndi (Mindi)
Northeastern Tasmanian†
Northern Daly
Nyulnyulan
Oyster Bay†
Pama–Nyungan
Southeastern Tasmanian†
Southern Daly
Tangkic
Tiwi (isolate)
Umbugarla/Ngurmbur† (isolate or small family?)
Wagiman (Wageman)† (isolate)
Wardaman† (isolate or small family)
Western Daly
Worrorran

According to Claire Bowern's Australian Languages (2011), Australian languages divide into approximately 30 primary sub-groups and 5 isolates. Meanwhile, Glottolog 4.1 (2019) recognizes 23 independent families and 9 isolates in Australia, comprising a total of 32 independent language groups.

Language families (non-sign)

In the following, each bullet item is a known or suspected language family.  Phyla with historically wide geographical distributions but comparatively few current-day speakers include Eskimo–Aleut, Na-Dené, Algic, Quechuan and Nilo-Saharan. 

The geographic headings over them are meant solely as a tool for grouping families into collections, more comprehensible than an unstructured list of a few hundred independent families.  Geographic relationship is convenient for that purpose, but these headings are not a suggestion of any "super-families" phylogenetically relating the families named. 

The number of individual languages in a family and the number of their speakers are only rough estimates: see dialect or language and linguistic demography for further explanation.

Language isolates

Language isolates are languages which are not part of any known family, and they can be alternatively described as being their own families' sole representants.

Africa
Bangime (Mali) (ethnically Dogon)
Siamou (Burkina Faso)
Jalaa (Nigeria) [extinct]
Mimi of Gaudefroy (Chad) [extinct]
Kujargé (Chad, Sudan)
Laal (Chad)
Lafofa (Sudan)
Meroitic (Egypt, Sudan) [extinct] (Glottolog classifies it as an isolate)
Nara (Eritrea)
Gule (Sudan) [extinct]
Berta (Sudan, Ethiopia)
Kunama (Eritrea, Ethiopia)
Shabo (Ethiopia)
Ongota (Ethiopia)
Hadza (Tanzania)
Sandawe (Tanzania) (may be related to Khoe)

Eurasia
Basque (Spain, France) (widely considered a descendant of or related to extinct Aquitanian)
Iberian (Spain) [extinct] (Glottolog classifies it as an isolate)
Etruscan (Italy) [extinct] (probably Tyrsenian)
Hattic (Turkey) [extinct] (sometimes linked to Northwest Caucasian)
Sumerian (Iraq) [extinct]
Elamite (Iran) [extinct] (sometimes linked to Dravidian)
Burushaski (Pakistan, India) (sometimes linked to Yeniseian)
Nihali (India) (sometimes linked to Kusunda or Munda)
Kusunda (Nepal)
Hruso (India)
Shompen (India)
Kenaboi (Malaysia) [extinct] (perhaps Austroasiatic) (Glottolog classifies it as an isolate)
Korean (North Korea, South Korea, China: Yanbian Korean Autonomous Prefecture) (sometimes linked to Paleosiberian, alternatively Jeju is sometimes classified as a separate language, creating a Koreanic family)
Nivkh or Gilyak (Russia) (sometimes linked to Chukotko–Kamchatkan)
Ainu language or languages (Japan, Russia) (like Arabic or Japanese, the diversity within Ainu is large enough that some consider it to be perhaps up to a dozen languages, while others consider it a single language with high dialectal diversity)

Oceania
Abinomn (New Guinea)
Abun (New Guinea)
Anêm (New Guinea)
Asabano (New Guinea)
Bilua (New Guinea)
Bogaya (New Guinea)
Burmeso (New Guinea)
Damal (New Guinea)
Dem (New Guinea)
Dibiyaso (New Guinea)
Duna (New Guinea)
Elseng (New Guinea)Fasu (New Guinea)Guriaso (New Guinea)Kaki Ae (New Guinea)Kapori (New Guinea)Karami (New Guinea) [extinct] (Glottolog classifies it as an isolate)
Kehu (New Guinea)Kibiri (New Guinea)Kimki (New Guinea)Kol (New Guinea)Kuot (Panaras) (New Guinea)Lavukaleve (New Guinea)Marori (New Guinea)Massep (New Guinea)Mawes (New Guinea)
Maybrat-Karon (New Guinea)
Molof (New Guinea)
Mor (Bomberai Peninsula) (New Guinea)
Mpur (New Guinea)Odiai (New Guinea)Papi (New Guinea)Pawaia (New Guinea)Pele-Ata (New Guinea)Purari (New Guinea)Pyu (New Guinea) [moribund]
Sause (New Guinea)Savosavo (New Guinea)Sulka (New Guinea)Tabo (New Guinea)Taiap (New Guinea)Tambora (New Guinea) [extinct] (Glottolog classifies it as an isolate)
Tanahmerah (New Guinea)Touo (New Guinea)Usku (New Guinea) [moribund]
Wiru (New Guinea)Yalë (New Guinea)Yele (New Guinea)Yerakai (New Guinea)Yetfa (New Guinea)Gaagudju (Australia) [extinct]
Kungarakany (Australia) [extinct]
Laragia (Australia)Minkin [extinct; perhaps a member of Yiwaidjan or Tankic] (Australia)Oyster Bay-Big River-Little Swanport (Australia)Tiwi (Melville and Bathurst Islands) (Australia)Umbugarla (Australia) [extinct]
Wadjiginy (Australia)Wageman (Australia)North America
Adai (US: Louisiana) [extinct]
Alsea-Yaquina (US: Oregon) [extinct]
Atakapa (US: Louisiana, Texas) [extinct] (part of the hypothetical Gulf languages)
Beothuk (Canada: Newfoundland) [extinct]
Cayuse (US: Oregon) [extinct]
Chimariko (US: California) [extinct] (part of the hypothetical Hokan languages)
Chitimacha (US: Louisiana) [extinct] (possibly part of the hypothetical Gulf languages)
Coahuilteco (US: Texas; Mexico: Coahuila ) [extinct]
Comecrudan (Mexico: Rio Grande) [extinct]
Cotoname (US: Texas; Mexico: Tamaulipas) [extinct]
Cuitlatec (Mexico: Guerrero) [extinct]
Esselen (US: California) [extinct]
Guaicurian (Mexico: Baja California) [extinct]
Karankawa (US: Texas) [extinct]
Karok (US: California)Klamath-Modoc (US: Oregon, California) [extinct]
Kutenai (Canada: British Columbia; US: Idaho, Montana)Maratino (Mexico: Tamaulipas) [extinct]
Molale (US: Oregon, Washington) [extinct]
Natchez (US: Mississippi, Louisiana) (linked to Muskogean in the hypothetical Gulf languages)
Salinan (US: California) [extinct] (part of the hypothetical Hokan languages)
Seri (Mexico: Sonora) (part of the hypothetical Hokan languages)
Siuslaw (US: Oregon) [extinct]
Takelma (US: Oregon) [extinct] (part of the hypothetical Penutian languages)
Timucua (US: Florida, Georgia) [extinct]
Tonkawa (US: Texas) [extinct]
Tunica (US: Mississippi, Louisiana, Arkansas)  (part of the hypothetical Gulf languages)
Washo (US: California, Nevada) (part of the hypothetical Hokan languages)
Yana (US: California) [extinct] (part of the hypothetical Hokan languages)
Yuchi (US: Georgia, Oklahoma)Zuni (also known as Shiwi) (US: New Mexico)South America
Aewa (Peru) [extinct]
Aikanã (Brazil: Rondônia)Andaqui (Colombia) [extinct]
Andoque (Colombia, Peru)Arutani (Brazil, Venezuela)Atacame (Ecuador) [extinct]
Betoi-Jirara (Colombia) [extinct]
Camsá (Colombia)Candoshi-Shapra (Peru)Canichana (Bolivia) [extinct]
Cayuvava (Bolivia)Chono (Chile) [extinct]
Cofán (Colombia, Ecuador)Culli (Peru) [extinct]
Fulniô (Brazil: Pernambuco)Guachi (Argentina) [extinct]
Guamo (Venezuela) [extinct]
Guató (Brazil, Bolivia)Hoti (Venezuela)Irantxe (Brazil: Mato Grosso)Itonama (Bolivia)Jirajaran (Venezuela) [extinct]
Kanoê (Brazil)Kariri (Brazil)Kunza (Chile, Argentina) [in the process of revitalization]
Kwaza (Brazil: Rondônia) [unclassified]
Leco (Bolivia)
Lule (Argentina) [extinct]
Máku (Brazil) [extinct]
Matanawi (Brazil) [extinct]
Mato Grosso Arára (Brazil) [extinct]
Mochica (Peru)
Mosetén-Chimané (Bolivia)
Movima (Bolivia)
Muniche (Peru) [extinct]
Mure (Bolivia) [extinct]
Omurano (Peru)
Oti (Brazil: São Paulo) [extinct]
Páez (Colombia) (see also Paezan)
Pankararú (Brazil) [extinct]
Payagua (Argentina, Paraguay) [extinct]
Pirahã (Brazil)
Puelche (Argentina, Chile)
Puinave (Colombia, Venezuela)
Pumé (Venezuela)
Puquina (Peru, Bolivia) [extinct]
Ramanos (Bolivia) [extinct]
Sapé (Venezuela) [extinct]
Sechura (Peru) [extinct]
Tallán (Peru) [extinct]
Taruma (Guyana, Brazil)
Taushiro (Peru)
Timote-Cuica (Venezuela)
Tinigua (Colombia)
Trumai (Brazil)
Tuxá (Brazil) [extinct]
Urarina (Peru)
Vilela (Argentina)
Waorani (also known as Sabela, Waodani) (Ecuador, Peru)
Warao (Guyana, Surinam, Venezuela)
Xukuru (Brazil) [extinct]
Yaghan (Chile) [extinct]
Yuracaré (Bolivia)
Yurumanguí (Colombia) [extinct]

Unclassified languages

Languages are considered unclassified either because, for one reason or another, little effort has been made to compare them with other languages, or more commonly because they are too poorly documented to permit reliable classification: most such languages are extinct and, most likely, will never be known well enough to classify.

Africa
Dama (Sierra Leone) [extinct]
Mangree [extinct]
Okwa [extinct]
Mpur (Ghana) [extinct]
Wawu [extinct]
Numidian [extinct]
Komta [extinct]
Rimba
Gail
Dima-Bottego [extinct]
Mangio
Degere [extinct]
Taita Cushitic [extinct]
Oropom (extinct; possibly spurious)
Hamba [extinct]
Omaio (Tanzania)
Serengeti-Dorobo (Tanzania) [extinct]
Vazimba (possible substrate language), see Beosi (Madagascar) [extinct]

Eurasia
Tartessian (Europa: Spain, Portugal) (extinct)
Quinqui (Europa: Spain)
Pictish (Europa: Scotland) (extinct)
Traveller Scottish (Europa: Scotland)
Polari (Europa: United Kingdom, Ireland) (extinct)
Ancient Ligurian (Europa: Italy) (extinct)
Paleo-Corsican (Europa: Corsica) (extinct)
Paleo-Sardinian (Europa: Sardinia) (extinct)
Camunic (Europa: Italy) (extinct, perhaps Tyrsenian)
Raetic (Europa: Italy) (extinct, probably Tyrsenian)
North Picene (Europa: Italy) (extinct)
Elymian (Europa: Sicily) (extinct, possibly Indo-European)
Sicanian (Europa: Sicily) (extinct)
Sicel (Europa: Sicily) (extinct, probably Indo-European)
Liburnian (Europa: Balkans) (extinct, perhaps Indo-European)
Illyrian (Europa: Balkans) (extinct)
Paeonian (Europa: Balkans) (extinct, perhaps Indo-European)
Kainuu Sami (Europa: Finland) (Glottolog classifies it as unclassifiable)
Cimmerian (Europa, Asia) (extinct) (probably Indo-European)
Hunnic (Europa, Asia) (extinct)
Pelasgian (Europa: Greece) (extinct)
Eteocretan (Europa: Crete) (extinct, probably descended from Minoan)
Minoan (Europa: Crete) (extinct)
Lemnian (Europa: Greece) (extinct, probably Tyrsenian)
Trojan (Europa, Asia: Turkey) (extinct)
Mysian (Europa, Asia) (extinct)
Isaurian (Europa, Asia) (extinct) (perhaps Indo-European and related to Luwian)
Ancient Cappadocian (Europa, Asia) (extinct)
Kaskian (Europa, Asia) (extinct) (perhaps related to Hattic)
Eteocypriot (Europa: Cyprus) (extinct)
Philistine (Asia) (extinct) (might be Indo-European)
Undeciphered -k language of ancient Yemen (Asia) (extinct) (probably Semitic, and identified with Himyaritic)
Gutian (Asia) (extinct)
Kassite (Asia) (extinct) (perhaps related to or part of Hurro-Urartian)
Proto-Euphratean (Asia) (extinct) 
Bactro-Margianan (Asia) (extinct)
Bazigar (Asia)
Xianbei (Asia) (extinct)
Ruanruan (Asia) (extinct)
Xiongnu (Asia) (extinct, with Glottolog code, unclassifiable)
Ná-Meo (Asia)
Koguryo (Asia) (extinct)
Baekje (Asia) (extinct)
Silla (Asia) (extinct)

Oceania
Katabaga (Philippines)
Ambermo (New Guinea)
Ndrangith (Australia) (Queensland) (extinct)
Ngaygungu (Australia) (extinct, perhaps Pama-Nyungan)
Wakabunga (Australia) (extinct)
Marau Wawa (Solomon Islands)
Tetepare (Solomon Islands)

North America
Monqui (Mexico: Baja California Sur) (extinct)
Pericú (Mexico: Baja California Sur) (extinct)
Amotomanco (Mexico) (extinct)
Concho (Mexico) (extinct)
Guachichil (Mexico) (extinct)
Tanpachoa (Mexico) (extinct)
Alagüilac (Guatemala) (extinct)
Naolan (Mexico: Tamaulipas) (extinct)
Quinigua (Mexico: Nuevo León) (extinct)
Solano (Mexico: Coahuila; US: Texas) (extinct)
Akokisa (US: Texas) (extinct)
Aranama (US: Texas) (extinct)
Bidai (US: Texas) (extinct)
Eyeish (US: Texas) (extinct)
Payaya (US: Texas) (extinct)
Appalousa (US: Louisiana) (extinct)
Avoyel (US: Louisiana) (extinct)
Quinipissa (US: Louisiana) (extinct)
Pascagoula (US: Mississippi) (extinct)
Neutral-Atiouandaronk (Canada: Ontario) (extinct)
Wenro (US, Canada) (extinct)
Erie (Canada: Ontario; US: Michigan, Ohio, Pennsylvania, New York) (extinct)
Pamunkey (US: Virginia) (extinct)
Meherrin (US: Virginia, North Carolina) (extinct)
Coree (US: North Carolina) (extinct)
Congaree (US: South Carolina) (extinct) (perhaps Arawakan)
Cusabo (US: South Carolina) (extinct) (possibly Arawakan)
Pedee (US: South Carolina) (extinct)
Guale (US: Georgia) (extinct)
Calusa (US: Florida) (extinct)
Tequesta (US: Florida) (extinct)
Quepos (Costa Rica) (extinct)
Guanahatabey (extinct, Greater Antilles)
Macorix (extinct, Greater Antilles)
Ciguayo (extinct, Greater Antilles)
Cueva (Panama) (extinct)
Haitian Vodoun Culture (Haiti) (Liturgical)

South America
Carabayo (Colombia)
Colima (Colombia) (extinct)
Envuelto (Colombia) (extinct)
Guanaca (Colombia) (extinct)
Hoxa (Colombia) (extinct)
Idabaez (Colombia) (extinct)
Malibu (Colombia) (extinct)
Mocana (Colombia) (extinct)
Muellamues (Colombia) (extinct)
Muzo (Colombia) (extinct)
Panche (Colombia) (extinct)
Pijao (Colombia) (extinct)
Quillacinga (Colombia) (extinct)
Quimbaya (Colombia) (extinct)
Sinúfana (Colombia) (extinct, perhaps Chocoan)
Yanacona (Colombia) (extinct)
Arakajú (Brazil) (extinct)
Baenan (Brazil) (extinct)
Bagua (Brazil) (extinct)
Cabixi-Natterer (Brazil) (extinct)
Catuquinaru-Bach (Brazil) (extinct)
Gamela (Brazil) (extinct)
Huamoé (Brazil) (extinct)
Jenipapo-Kanindé (Brazil) (extinct)
Kaimbé (Brazil) (extinct)
Kambiwá (Brazil) (extinct)
Kantarure (Brazil) (extinct)
Kapinawá (Brazil) (extinct?)
Karirí-Xocó (Brazil) (extinct)
Natú (Brazil) (extinct)
Panzaleo (Brazil) (extinct)
Pitaguary (Brazil) (extinct)
Tapajó (Brazil) (extinct)
Tarairiú (Brazil) (extinct)
Tembey (Brazil) (extinct)
Unainuman (Brazil) (extinct)
Urucucús (Brazil) (extinct)
Uru-Pa-In (Brazil) (extinct)
Waitaká (Brazil) (extinct)
Xocó (Brazil) (extinct)
Caranqui (Ecuador) (extinct, perhaps Barbacoan)
Imbabura (Ecuador) (extinct)
Kara (Ecuador) (extinct)
Malacato (Ecuador) (extinct)
Palta (Ecuador) (extinct)
Panzaleo (Ecuador) (extinct)
Pasto (Ecuador) (extinct)
Puruguay (Ecuador) (extinct)
Puruhá (Ecuador) (extinct)
Rabona (Ecuador) (extinct)
Xiroa (Ecuador) (extinct)
Bagua (Peru) (extinct)
Chacha (Peru) (extinct)
Chirino (Peru) (extinct)
Copallén (Peru) (extinct)
Patagón (Peru) (extinct)
Quingnam (Peru) (extinct)
Sácata (Peru) (extinct)
Tabancale (Peru) (extinct)
Yanacona (Peru) (extinct)
Chholo (Bolivia) (extinct)
Gorgotoqui (Bolivia) (extinct)
Majena (Bolivia) (extinct)
Pacahuaras-Castillo (Bolivia) (extinct)
Sansimoniano (Bolivia) (extinct)
Chango (Peru, Chile) (extinct)
Chicha (Bolivia, Argentina) (extinct)
Querandi (Uruguay) (extinct)
Omaguaca (Argentina) (extinct)
Ocloya (Argentina) (extinct)
Tastil (Argentina) (extinct)
Tilianes (Argentina) (extinct)
Toara (Argentina) (extinct)
Fiscara (Argentina) (extinct)
Humahuaca (Argentina) (extinct)
Guachipas (Argentina) (extinct)
Kakán (Argentina/Chile) (in the process of revitalization)
Tonokoté (Argentina) (extinct)
Fayjatases (Chile) (extinct)
Chiquillan (Chile) (extinct)
Sanavirón (Argentina) (extinct)
Comechingón (Argentina) (extinct)
Querandí (Argentina) (extinct)
Poyas (Argentina/Chile) (extinct)
Guaicaro (Argentina/Chile) (extinct)

Unattested languages

Unattested languages may be names of purported languages for which no direct evidence exists, languages for which all evidence has been lost, or hypothetical proto-languages proposed in linguistic reconstruction.

Africa
Mawa (Nigeria) (extinct)
Kwisi (Angola) (extinct)
Weyto (Ethiopia) (extinct)
Rer Bare (Ethiopia) (extinct)
Arusha (Tanzania)

Eurasia
Harappan (India) (extinct, perhaps related to either Dravidian languages or Indo-Aryan languages)
Sentinelese (India) (possibly Ongan)

Oceania
Moksela (Indonesia) (extinct)
Palumata (Indonesia) (extinct)
Giyug (Australia) (extinct)
Sörsörian (Vanuatu) (extinct)

North America
Jumano (Mexico) (extinct)
Lumbee (United States) (extinct)
Guale (United States) (extinct)
Yamasee (United States) (extinct)

South America
Apoto (Brazil) (extinct)
Flecheiros (Brazil)
Miarrã (Brazil) (extinct)
Tremembé (Brazil) (extinct)
Pankararé (Brazil) (extinct)
Truká (Brazil) (extinct)
Wasu (Brazil) (extinct)
Wakoná (Brazil) (extinct)

Extinct families and unclassified languages
This section lists extinct languages and families which have no known living relatives; while a minority of these is well known but is still classified as genetically independent (like the ancient Sumerian language), the lack of attestation makes many of these hard to put into larger groups.

Other language classifications
The classification of languages into families, assumes that all of them develop from a single parent proto-language and evolve over time into different daughter language(s). While the vast majority of tongues fit this description fairly well, there are exceptions.
A mixed language often refers to a particular combination of existing ones, which may stem from different families: a pidgin is a simple language used for communication between groups; this may involve simplification and/or mixing of multiple languages. When a pidgin develops into a more stable language which children learn from birth, it is usually called a "creole".
Whether for ease of use or created for use in fiction, languages can also be constructed from the ground up, rather than develop from existing ones; these are known as constructed languages.

Sign languages 
 
The family relationships of sign languages are not well established due to a lagging in linguistic research, and many are isolates (cf. Wittmann 1991).

Beyond these language families, there exist many isolates, including:
 Al-Sayyid Bedouin Sign Language
 Hawaiʻi Sign Language
 Inuit Sign Language
 Mauritian Sign Language
 Nicaraguan Sign Language
 Peruvian Sign Language

Proposed language families

See also 

 
 
 Ethnologue#Language families
 
 Index of language articles
 
 
 Glottolog#Language families
 Language isolate#List of language isolates by continent
 Lists of languages

References

External links 
Glottolog
Ethnologue
MultiTree Project  
Comparative Swadesh list tables of various language families (from Wiktionary)

 Families